Established in 2002, the CGI Rochester International Jazz Festival Presented by M&T Bank takes place in June of each year, in Rochester, New York. It is owned and produced by RIJF, LLC, whose principals are John Nugent, Co-Producer and Artistic Director, and Marc Iacona, Co-Producer and Executive Director.

The nine-day festival is held at 20+ diverse venues throughout downtown Rochester New York's East End cultural and entertainment district, including  Kodak Hall at Eastman Theatre, Kilbourn Hall at the Eastman School of Music, Hatch Recital Hall, Lutheran Church of the Reformation, Rochester Regional Health Big Tent, Max of Eastman Place, Montage Music Hall, The Auditorium at Broad and Chestnut, Wilder Room, The Little Theatre, Bethel Christian Fellowship, and multiple outdoor free stages and venues - all within walking distance and many on "Jazz Street" (otherwise known as Gibbs Street during the rest of the year), which is closed off for the festival's nine days. More than 90 free concerts and events are presented on outdoor stages and other free venues. A five-day Jazz Workshop provides an opportunity for elementary and high school music students to learn from and play alongside noted musicians performing at the festival.  The festival supports the RIJF Eastman School of Music Jazz Scholarship, which has awarded almost $500,000 in scholarships since 2002 to 40 students to attend the Eastman School of Music.

In 2019, the festival also drew more than 208,000 to see 1750+ musicians from around the world perform in 325+ shows.

In 2018, the festival drew a record-setting crowd of more than 208,000 people from around the world to see more than 1500 musicians from 20 countries performed in 320+ shows.

CGI Communications became the festival's new title sponsor as of July 2018, succeeding Xerox, which was the title sponsor for 10 years from 2009 through 2018.
M&T Bank is the presenting sponsor.

In 2009, attendance was estimated at a record 133,000 for the 225 concerts presented.

In 2010,  162,000 people attended the Xerox Rochester International Jazz Festival's 250 concerts presented over nine days, breaking the record set the prior year of 133,000.

2011 saw another record-setting year with 285 concerts presented over nine days and in 18 different venues.  Attendance reached an all-time high of 182,000.

In 2012, the 11th Edition hit another attendance record of 187,000, a record number of headliner sell-outs,   the addition of new venue, Hatch Recital Hall and 9 days of spectacular weather. Norah Jones, Diana Krall, Steve Martin & The Steep Canyon Rangers, Esperanza Spalding, Zappa Plays Zappa, and Daryl Hall "Live From Daryl's House" with special guest Keb' Mo' headlined this year.

Festival history

2009 appearances
The 2009 lineup of major performances was announced on March 24, 2009.

Headliners
Smokey Robinson
Michael McDonald
Dave Brubeck

Other appearances
Taj Mahal
The Susan Tedeschi Band
Jake Shimabukuro
"SMV" (bassists Stanley Clarke, Marcus Miller, and Victor Wooten) on their Thunder Tour

2010 appearances

Headliners
The following headlining acts all played ticketed shows at Eastman Theatre
Gladys Knight
Herbie Hancock
Keb' Mo'
Jeff Beck's first show sold out soon after it was announced, prompting the announcement of a second show
John Pizzarelli
Bernie Williams

Other Appearances
Trombone Shorty played three nights in a row at the festival
Los Lonely Boys made a repeat appearance, playing a free outdoor show
Smash Mouth closed the festival with a packed, free, outdoor finale concert.

Past performers

Woody Allen and His New Orleans Jazz Band
Tony Bennett
Ravi Coltrane
Chaka Khan
Al Jarreau
The Respect Sextet
Chris Botti
Bobby McFerrin & Jack DeJohnette
Bill Frisell
Al (Roomful of Blues) Copley
Sonny Rollins
Chick Corea
Hilton Ruiz
Madeleine Peyroux
Steve Turre
Strunz & Farah
Aretha Franklin
Charles Ellison Quartet
Sonny Rollins
Dr. John
Dave Brubeck
George Benson
Stephane Wrembel
Norah Jones
The Carnegie Hall Jazz Band led by Jon Faddis
John Hammond
Willem Breuker
Michael Moore
Harold Danko

Dave Pietro & Banda Brazil
Wallace Roney
Paul Smoker
Juana Molina
Derek Trucks
Gap Mangione
Harry Allen
Lew Tabackin
Paula West Quartet
Joe LaBarbera
Jonas Kullhammar Quartet
autorickshaw
Raul Midón
Wycliffe Gordon
The Shuffle Demons
Marian McPartland
Dave Mancini Quartet
David Sanborn
Oscar Peterson
James Brown
Das Contras
Phil Woods
McCoy Tyner
Toots Thielemans
Wayne Shorter
Susan Tedeschi
Etta James
Little Feat
Soulive
Dickey Betts
Dianne Reeves
Slide Hampton
Medeski Martin and Wood

References

External links
Rochester International Jazz Festival Official Website
Jazz@Rochester: A blog covering the RIJF and live jazz in and around Rochester, New York.

2002 establishments in New York (state)
Music festivals established in 2002
Jazz festivals in New York (state)
Music of Rochester, New York
Summer festivals
Festivals in Rochester, New York